Lower Genesee Street Historic District is a national historic district located at Utica in Oneida County, New York. The district includes 45 contributing buildings and encompasses a collection of commercial and industrial buildings in the north center of the city.  The oldest extant buildings in the city are located here, which includes buildings dating from 1830 to 1929.

It was listed on the National Register of Historic Places in 1982.

References

Utica, New York
Historic districts in Oneida County, New York
Historic districts on the National Register of Historic Places in New York (state)
National Register of Historic Places in Oneida County, New York